The River Queen was a sidewheel steamer launched in 1864.  It soon became closely associated with President Abraham Lincoln and General Ulysses S. Grant while operating on the Potomac River, and was used for an unsuccessful peace conference in 1865 during the last year of the American Civil War. Later it operated as a ferry serving the islands of Martha's Vineyard and Nantucket during the late 19th century.  Late in its career, it returned to the Potomac as an excursion vessel, and in 1911, it was destroyed in a fire.

Construction
River Queen was built at Keyport, New Jersey in 1864.  She was initially owned by Alfred Van Santvoord, and later was one of four steamers operating for the New Bedford, Martha's Vineyard, and Nantucket Steamboat Co when that concern was organized in March 1886. (The other three vessels were Island Home, Martha's Vineyard and Monohansett.) River Queen had sailed this route since 1871 for the company's predecessors.

Civil War service
Chartered by the U.S. Department of War, the River Queen was used by General Ulysses S. Grant as his private dispatch boat on the Potomac River in 1865. On February 3, 1865, the Hampton Roads Conference took place on the River Queen in an unsuccessful attempt to negotiate an end to the American Civil War. While the conference was being held in the saloon of the ship, the River Queen was lashed to the Mary Martin, another ship.

In March 1865, Abraham Lincoln met with General William T. Sherman, Rear Admiral David Dixon Porter and General Grant aboard the River Queen to discuss strategy for the end of the Civil War. Both Lincoln and Grant liked this vessel; Lincoln rode aboard her two days before his assassination in April. Capt. Nathan B. Saunders of the Fall River steamer line was captain of the River Queen during its Civil War service.

Ferry career
After the war, River Queen was operated by the Newport Steamboat Company between Providence, R.I. and Newport, R.I. The American Lloyd's Register of American and Foreign Shipping during 1865–1872 records the River Queen as a 500-ton vessel with a homeport in Providence. Its owner was listed as R. Buffon and its master as Capt. Williams.

River Queen was sold by the New Bedford, Martha's Vineyard, and Nantucket Steamboat Co. in 1893  to the Mount Vernon & Marshall Hall Steamboat Co. of Washington, D.C. During 1897–1900 the Record of American and Foreign Shipping lists the River Queen as a 181' long, 426-ton sidewheeler hailing out of New Bedford, owned by "Mt. Vernon & Marshall Hall S. B. Co." and under the command of a Capt. Wood.

River Queen was still operating in 1910 on the Potomac River, by that time among the oldest side-wheelers still in service. In July 1911, newspapers reported the burning of the River Queen "to the water's edge" following the explosion of a signal lantern on board. The press reported that "For the past year or two the River Queen has been used as an excursion boat for Negroes."

In popular culture
River Queen is the name of a boat referenced in the anime Yurei Deco.

Notes

References

  - reprint of a 1940 article in the Vineyard Gazette
  - 1860s photographs of Nantucket
  - Mystic Seaport - G. W. Blunt White Library - Ship & Yacht Register
 Turner, Harry B. The Story of the Island Steamers (The Inquirer and Mirror Press, 1910)

Paddle steamers
Ferries of Massachusetts
Maritime history of the United States
Martha's Vineyard
Ships built in Keyport, New Jersey
1864 ships
Steamboats of Nantucket Sound
Transportation in Dukes County, Massachusetts
Transportation in Nantucket, Massachusetts
Presidential yachts of the United States